HMS Little Belt was the mercantile sloop Friends Good Will, launched in 1811, which the British captured shortly after the start of the War of 1812. The British took her into service as Little Belt, armed her with three guns, and incorporated her into the Royal Navy's Lake Erie fleet. The American schooner  captured her during the Battle of Lake Erie and the Americans took her into service under her existing name. A storm drove her ashore in October 1813 and a British expeditionary force burnt her in December 1813.

Career
During the winter of 1810–11, Major Oliver Williams built the sloop at River Rouge, near Detroit. She then sailed on the Great Lakes in pursuit of his business. She was sailing from Chicago to Detroit under the command of Master William Lee, with Williams aboard as supercargo, having delivered military supplies to Fort Dearborn from Fort Michilimackinac and bringing back a consignment of furs from the government agent there when Lee put in at the fort on 17 July 1812. Unfortunately, in their absence, the British had captured the fort earlier the same day. Shortly after the British captured the fort two American vessels, including Friends Good Will and Erie (Capt. Norton), sailed up, arriving unaware of the commencement of the war, or the fort's capture. The British hoisted the American flag and when the Americans came ashore the British captured the ships as prizes of war. In addition to Friends Good Will and the sloop Erie, they captured the anchored Mary and Salina, which they sent to Detroit as cartels with the prisoners they had taken at the fort and from the vessels.

The British took Friends Good Will into service as HMS Little Belt, armed her with three guns, and appointed Lieutenant John F. Breman to command her. She joined Captain James Barclay's squadron on Lake Erie shortly after her capture.

On 10 September 1813, off Put-in-Bay, Ohio, the schooner  of Captain Oliver Hazard Perry’s squadron captured Little Belt late during the Battle of Lake Erie. Little Belt brought up the rear of the British squadron and did come under fire. When it was clear that the British had lost, she unsuccessfully attempted to escape, and was eventually captured just south of Fort Malden near Amherstberg, Ontario. Little Belt sustained no casualties during the action.

Following repairs, she was fitted for service in the U.S. Navy and joined Perry's squadron 23 October to help transport General William Henry Harrison’s army to Buffalo. Little Belt cruised Lake Erie through the latter part of 1813 in support of American troops fighting the British and Indians in western New York.

Fate
A storm in October 1813 drove Little Belt ashore at Black Rock, New York, (now a neighborhood of Buffalo, New York). All efforts to refloat her failed. Then on 30 December a British landing party captured the Navy yard at Black Rock during the Battle of Buffalo, and burnt her and several other vessels there.

See also
 Friends Good Will, a working American reproduction that the Michigan Maritime Museum maintains and operates.

Notes, citations, and references
Notes

Citations

References
 DANFS – Little Belt: 
 Ellis, Franklin (1880) History of Shiawassee and Clinton counties, Michigan. (D.W. Ensign).
 
 Mansfield, John Brandt (1899) History of the Great lakes .... (J. H. Beers & co.).
 Kirkland, Joseph (1893) The Chicago Massacre of 1812: with illustrations and historical documents (Dibble Publ. Co.)

External links
 For a longer article on the history of Friends Good Will see the Michigan Maritime Museum website at: 

Sloops of the Royal Navy
War of 1812 ships of the United Kingdom
Great Lakes ships
1811 ships
Ships built in River Rouge, Michigan
Vessels captured by the United States Navy
Schooners of the United States Navy
Provincial Marine